Wauraltee may refer to:

Aboriginal name for Wardang Island in Australia
Former name for the town of Port Victoria, South Australia
Hundred of Wauraltee, a cadastral unit  in Australia
Wauraltee, South Australia, a locality